Katarina Krpež Šlezak (born 2 May 1988) is a Serbian handball player for SCM Craiova and the Serbian national team.

Individual awards
Nemzeti Bajnokság I Topscorer: 2016, 2018, 2019
Top Scorer of the European Championship: 2018

Personal life
She also holds a Hungarian passport obtained in 2017 through paternal ancestry.

References

External links

Living people
1988 births
Serbian female handball players
Serbian people of Hungarian descent
Hungarian people of Serbian descent
Sportspeople from Sombor
Expatriate handball players
Serbian expatriate sportspeople in North Macedonia
Serbian expatriate sportspeople in Hungary
Serbian expatriate sportspeople in Russia
Serbian expatriate sportspeople in Slovenia
Mediterranean Games gold medalists for Serbia
Competitors at the 2013 Mediterranean Games
Mediterranean Games medalists in handball
Competitors at the 2009 Mediterranean Games